Come On Do the Jerk (Tamla 54109) was a 1964 song recorded by R&B group the Miracles on Motown Records' Tamla label subsidiary. The song was co-written by Miracles members Pete Moore, Bobby Rogers, Smokey Robinson, and Ronnie White.  A single-only release, it did not appear on any original Miracles studio album, and was the group's last single release of 1964.
Robinson and fellow Miracle Bobby Rogers were the song's producers.
The song's flip side, "Baby Don't You Go", was also a popular regional hit but was not released on CD until The 35th Anniversary Collection in 1994. Both sides of this single received new stereo mixes for the 2002 compilation Ooo Baby Baby: The Anthology.

"Come On Do the Jerk" charted at #50 on the Billboard Hot 100 and at # 22 on the Cash Box R&B chart.(Billboard had temporarily suspended its R&B chart at this time).

Background
An instructional dance number, this song was one of several songs based on the jerk, a very popular 1960s "dance craze". 
Described by Miracles lead singer Smokey Robinson as the intended follow-up song to the group's 1963 million-selling smash "Mickey's Monkey" the previous year, "Come On Do the Jerk" was actually recorded in a similar tempo. As the song begins, longtime Miracles drummer Donald "Spike" Whited and Miracles member, guitarist Marv Tarplin begin the song, while Smokey, as the song's narrator, offers the invitation:

 Come on everybody, gather 'round
 get hip to the new sensation
 There's a brand new dance coming to your town
  and it's sweepin' across the nation
  Come on do the jerk

The other Miracles, Ronnie White, Claudette Robinson, Pete Moore, and Bobby Rogers, echo Smokey's lead,  with chants of the song's title, in classic call and response style.
Then, midway through the song, Smokey's role changes... from narrator to dance instructor, as he instructs the listener on the Jerk's simple dance steps:

Now, snap your back...
like a bullwhip crack...
now jerk your hip....
let your backbone slip...

Credits and personnel

The Miracles
Smokey Robinson – lead vocals
Claudette Robinson – backing vocals
Pete Moore – backing vocals
Bobby Rogers – backing vocals
Ronnie White – backing vocals
Marv Tarplin – lead guitar

Additional Personnel
Don Whited – drums
The Funk Brothers – additional instrumentation

Chart performance

Television performances
The Miracles themselves performed Come On Do the Jerk on a telecast of the syndicated Detroit – based teen dance party show Teen Town . The song appears on several Miracles "Greatest Hits" collections, having first appeared on their album, Greatest Hits Vol.2
The Righteous Brothers, Bill Medley and Bobby Hatfield, performed a cover of this song on a 1964 telecast of the ABC TV series, Shindig!.(available on YouTube).

Cover versions
Recording group The T-Bones also recorded an instrumental cover version of The Miracles' "Come On Do the Jerk" on their 1965 LP entitled "Doin' the Jerk".

References

External links
 See The Miracles perform "Come On Do The Jerk" at this link

The Miracles songs
Tamla Records singles
1964 songs
Novelty and fad dances
Songs written by Warren "Pete" Moore
Songs written by Smokey Robinson
Songs written by Ronald White
Songs written by Bobby Rogers
Song recordings produced by Smokey Robinson
Songs about dancing